Mištautai is a village in Kėdainiai district municipality, in Kaunas County, in central Lithuania. It is located by the Jaugila river. According to the 2011 census, the village has a population of 18.

Demography

References

Villages in Kaunas County
Kėdainiai District Municipality